"Land of the Living" is a song written by Tia Sillers and Wayland Patton, and recorded by American country music artist Pam Tillis.  It was released in September 1997 as the second single from her Greatest Hits compilation album.  The song reached #5 on the Billboard Hot Country Singles & Tracks chart.

Chart performance

References

1997 singles
1997 songs
Pam Tillis songs
Arista Nashville singles
Song recordings produced by Billy Joe Walker Jr.
Songs written by Wayland Patton
Songs written by Tia Sillers